Poinsett House is a historic home located at Kenton, Kent County, Delaware.  The house was built in the mid-18th century as a tenant house.  The original section is a two-story, two-bay, one-room plan brick structure measuring 20 feet by 18 feet.  Attached to it are two log wings added in the early 19th century.  The addition of the one-room, two-story log wing immediately to the west of the core effectively converted the house into a hall-parlor-type, four-bay dwelling.

It was listed on the National Register of Historic Places in 1983.

References

Houses on the National Register of Historic Places in Delaware
Houses in Kent County, Delaware
Kenton, Delaware
National Register of Historic Places in Kent County, Delaware